Øyangen is a lake on the border of the municipalities of Gran in Innlandet county and Hurdal in Viken county in Norway.

See also
List of lakes in Norway

References

Gran, Norway
Hurdal
Lakes of Innlandet
Lakes of Viken (county)